25 Years On is the eighth studio album by the English rock band Hawkwind, released in 1978. The band released it under the name "Hawklords" for legal reasons, as there was a dispute over ownership of the name "Hawkwind" at the time. It reached No. 48 on the UK album charts. It was originally titled 25 Years On and the first 25000 were pressed as this until the band decided to simply call it Hawklords. Subsequent re-releases have reverted to the name 25 Years On and the band also now use this name on their website.

Background and recording

Hawkwind had self-imploded on a USA tour earlier in the year leaving only Robert Calvert, Dave Brock and Simon King to embark on this project. They were joined by Harvey Bainbridge who had played bass in Devon group Ark who in turn had performed with Calvert and Brock as the Sonic Assassins, and by keyboardist Steve Swindells who had been in Pilot. During the Devon recording session King returned home to London and was replaced by Martin Griffin (also from Ark), but King subsequently returned giving the band two drummers. Simon House had left the earlier band to join David Bowie but contributed violin to the sessions, as did noted British jazz trumpeter Henry Lowther. Road manager Les McClure also sneaked a performance in.

The music is perhaps as far removed from space rock as the band would ever get, these tracks being tightly arranged pieces more in tune with New Wave of the time rather than the band's history. Lyrically this is Calvert's most diverse dealing with themes such as telepathy ("Psi Power"), skydiving ("Free Fall"), Australian drug misuse ("Flying Doctor"), heroic bravery ("The Only Ones") and espionage ("The Dead Dreams of the Cold War Kid"). There is a light-hearted playfulness to these tracks, only the lyrics of "The Age of the Micro Man" hinted at the bleak cold futuristic factory workers concept that Calvert and Barney Bubbles put together for the stage show of the album. The programme was reproduced in the CD booklet of the Atomhenge re-release.

"Psi Power" and "25 Years" were released as singles but are slightly different versions to those that appeared on the album.

New acoustic versions of "Flying Doctor", "Psi Power" and "The Age of the Micro Man" were included on The Road to Utopia (2018), produced and arranged by Mike Batt with additional orchestrations.

Track listing

Side 1

Side 2

Atomhenge bonus tracks

Atomhenge bonus CD: "The Sonic Assassins"
"Over the Top" (Calvert, Brock, Bainbridge, Paul Hayles, Martin Griffin) – 7:50
"Magnu" (Brock) – 3:12
"Angels of Life" (Brock) – 1:12
"Freefall" (Calvert, Bainbridge) – 7:56
"Death Trap" (Calvert, Brock) – 4:30
"The Only Ones" [acoustic demo] (Calvert, Brock) – 4:38
"(Only) The Dead Dreams of the Cold War Kid" [demo] (Calvert) – 3:31
"Flying Doctor" [live studio rehearsal version] (Calvert, Brock) – 5:37
"25 Years" [take one] (Brock) – 8:00
"Assassination" – 3:56
"Freefall" [take two] (Calvert, Bainbridge) – 5:28
"Only the Dead Dreams of the Cold War Kid" [take two] (Calvert, Brock) – 3:16
"The Age of the Micro Man" [take one] (Calvert, Brock) – 5:44
"Automoton" [full extended version] (Calvert, Brock) – 2:33
"Digger Jam" – 2:38

Personnel
Hawklords
Robert Calvert – lead vocals, acoustic guitar (track 7)
Dave Brock – acoustic and electric guitar, keyboards, backing vocals
Harvey Bainbridge – bass guitar, backing vocals, synthesizers
Steve Swindells – keyboards
Simon King – drums (tracks 4,7,8), Congas (track 6)
Martin Griffin – drums (tracks 1,2,5,6)
with
Simon House – violin (tracks 6,7,8)
Henry Lowther – trumpet (track 1)
Les McClure – whisper voice (track 4)

Credits
Recorded: Ronnie Lane's Mobile Studio at Langley Farm, Devon.
Produced: Robert Calvert and Dave Brock. Engineered by Dennis Smith, Neil Fawcus and Neil Mount.
Mixed at Wessex Studios, London. Engineered by Tim Friese-Greene and Mike Shipley.
Sleeve by Barney Bubbles and Brian Griffin.
CD 1 tracks 9–10: A & B sides of "Psi Power" single, released as Charisma CB323 in October 1978
CD 1 track 11: A-side of "25 Years" single, released as Charisma CB332 in May 1979
CD 2 tracks 1–5: Sonic Assassins: Recorded at the Queens Hall, Barnstaple on 23 December 1977
CD 2 tracks 6–15: Unreleased session tapes: Recorded at Langley Farm, Devon between June and August 1978

Release history
October 1978: Charisma, CDS4014, UK vinyl. Initial copies came with an inner sleeve.
August 1982: Charisma, CHC10, UK vinyl
April 1989: Virgin, CDSCD4014, UK CD
January 2009: Atomhenge (Cherry Red) Records, ATOMCD2006, UK 2CD

References

External links
Atomhenge Records
Starfarer  – reviews, October 1978

1978 albums
Hawkwind albums
Charisma Records albums